Kenneth P. Miller (born September 21, 1963) is a professor of Government at Claremont McKenna College, specializing in state politics, policy, and law. Miller is the Director of the Rose Institute of State and Local Government, a research institute known for its expertise in redistricting, elections, demographic research, and public policy analysis. He has written extensively on state politics and policy, direct democracy, constitutional law, courts, and political polarization. He is a member of the California State Bar Association and the American Political Science Association. He has been a visiting scholar at Princeton University's James Madison Program in American Ideals and Institutions (2011-2012) and Southern Methodist University’s John Goodwin Tower Center for Public Policy and International Affairs (2017-2018).

Education
Miller has a B.A. from Pomona College, where he majored in Government (1985), and a J.D. from Harvard Law School (1988). In 2002, he received a Ph.D. in political science from the University of California at Berkeley.

Career 
Prior to his academic career, Miller was an attorney with the law firm Morrison & Foerster, and in 1991 co-founded the firm's Sacramento office.

Upon completion of his Ph.D., Miller taught for one year at the University of San Francisco before moving to Claremont McKenna College in 2003. He became Associate Director of the Rose Institute of State and Local Government in 2009. In 2014, he became the founding co-director of Dreier Roundtable, a program that organizes discussions by political leaders, scholars, and others from a broad range of viewpoints, and provides support for students interested in national politics and policy. In 2020, he was named the Don H. and Edessa Associate Professor of State and Local Government at Claremont McKenna College.

Scholarship 
Miller is the author or co-author of several books and articles regarding state and national politics, policy, and law. His book Texas vs. California: A History of the Struggle for the Future of America (Oxford 2020) explores why the nation’s two largest states have polarized politically, and how they have assumed leadership of the nation’s red and blue state blocs. His book Direct Democracy and the Courts (Cambridge 2009) analyzes the initiative process within the checks and balances system, and has been called “the standard work on the relationship between the judiciary and direct democracy.” Other works include Parchment Barriers: Political Polarization and the Limits of Constitutional Order (Kansas 2018) (co-edited with Zachary Courser and Eric Helland) and The New Political Geography of California (Berkeley Public Policy Press 2008) co-edited with Frederick Douzet and Thad Kousser. He also has published articles on topics including the California Supreme Court, state constitutions, and voting rights.

Rose Institute of State and Local Government 
As part of his work for the Rose Institute, he maintains the Miller-Rose Institute Initiative Database, a comprehensive collection of all voter-approved ballot initiatives throughout the United States. The database also summarizes and analyzes legal challenges to these ballot measures as well as the courts’ treatment of such cases. He also supervises the Institute's Video Voter program, which provides the public non-partisan, online video summaries of California state ballot measures.

Perry v. Schwarzenegger 
In January 2010, Miller appeared in federal court as an expert witness in Perry v. Schwarzenegger, the case that challenged California's Proposition 8 of 2008 and sought to establish a federal constitutional right of same-sex couples to marry. Miller was presented to the court as an expert in California and American politics to testify regarding the political power of gays and lesbians in California and the United States, an issue potentially relevant in determining the appropriate level of judicial scrutiny to apply to the law. Miller testified that the plaintiffs’ claim that gays and lesbians are politically powerless, thus deserving special protective intervention by the courts, ignored evidence that in several respects this group wields significant political power and can effectively pursue its goals through political institutions. Miller cited support for same-sex marriage rights by media organizations, unions, corporations, the Democratic Party, and California's leading elected officials (including the governor at the time, Arnold Schwarzenegger).

Plaintiffs’ counsel objected to Professor Miller's qualifications as an expert in the areas of discrimination against gays and lesbians and gay and lesbian political power. District Court judge Vaughn Walker allowed Miller to testify. In his ruling in the case, the judge stated that Miller has “significant experience with politics generally” but is “not sufficiently familiar with gay and lesbian politics to offer opinions on the relative political power of gays and lesbians.” Walker went on to declare Proposition 8 unconstitutional.

On appeal. the case eventually reached the U.S. Supreme Court under the title Hollingsworth v. Perry. In its decision, the Supreme Court did not reach the question of whether same-sex couples have a constitutional right to marry. Instead, the Court held that California's refusal to defend Proposition 8 in federal court was determinative because the proponents of Proposition 8 lacked Article III standing to defend the law. As a consequence, the District Court's decision in Perry was allowed to stand. In his dissenting opinion on the standing issue, Justice Anthony Kennedy cited Miller's book Direct Democracy and the Courts.

Selected published works 
Texas vs. California: A History of Their Struggle for the Future of America (Oxford 2020)

Parchment Barriers: Political Polarization and the Limits of Constitutional Order (co-editor) (Kansas 2018)

Direct Democracy and the Courts (Cambridge 2009)

The New Political Geography of California (co-editor) (Berkeley Public Policy Press 2008).

References

External links
Claremont McKenna info page
report on Miller's testimony in the Perry trial
Cambridge University press link to Miller's book

Pomona College alumni
Harvard Law School alumni
University of California, Berkeley alumni
American political scientists
Claremont McKenna College faculty
1948 births
Living people
People associated with Morrison & Foerster